Judaism considers some names of God so holy that, once written, they should not be erased: YHWH, Adonai, El ("God"), Elohim ("God," a plural noun), Shaddai ("Almighty"), and Tzevaot ("[of] Hosts"); some also include Ehyeh ("I Will Be"). Early authorities considered other Hebrew names mere epithets or descriptions of God, and wrote that they and names in other languages may be written and erased freely. Some moderns advise special care even in these cases, and many Orthodox Jews have adopted the chumras of writing "G-d" instead of "God" in English or saying Ṭēt-Vav ( "9-6") instead of Yōd-Hē ( "10-5" but also "Jah") for the number fifteen or Ṭēt-Zayin ( "9-7") instead of Yōd-Vav ( "10-6") for the number sixteen in Hebrew.

Seven names of God
The names of God that, once written, cannot be erased because of their holiness are the Tetragrammaton, Adonai, El, Elohim,  Shaddai, Tzevaot; some also include Ehyeh ("I Will Be"). In addition, the name Jah—because it forms part of the Tetragrammaton—is similarly protected. Rabbi Jose considered "Tzevaot" a common name and Rabbi Ishmael considered "Elohim" to be one. All other names, such as "Merciful", "Gracious" and "Faithful", merely represent attributes that are also common to human beings.

YHWH

Also abbreviated Jah, the most common name of God in the Hebrew Bible is the Tetragrammaton, that is usually transcribed as YHWH. Hebrew script is an abjad, so that the letters in the name are normally consonants, usually expanded as Yahweh in English.

Modern Jewish culture judges it forbidden to pronounce this name. In prayers it is replaced by the word Adonai ("My Lord"), and in discussion by HaShem ("The Name"). Nothing in the Torah explicitly prohibits speaking the name and the Book of Ruth shows it was being pronounced as late as the 5th century BCE. It had ceased to be spoken aloud by at least the 3rd century BCE, during Second Temple Judaism. The Talmud relates, perhaps anecdotally, this began with the death of Simeon the Just. Vowel points began to be added to the Hebrew text only in the early medieval period. The Masoretic Text adds to the Tetragrammaton the vowel points of Adonai or Elohim (depending on the context), indicating that these are the words to be pronounced in place of the Tetragrammaton (see Qere and Ketiv), as shown also by the subtle pronunciation changes when combined with a preposition or a conjunction.

The Tetragrammaton appears in Genesis and occurs 6,828 times in total in the Stuttgart edition of the Masoretic Text. It is thought to be an archaic third-person singular of the imperfective aspect of the verb "to be" (i.e., "[He] is/was/will be"). This agrees with the passage in Exodus where God names himself as "I Will Be What I Will Be" using the first-person singular imperfective aspect, open to interpretation as present tense ("I am what I am"), future ("I shall be what I shall be"), or imperfect ("I used to be what I used to be").

Rabbinical Judaism teaches that the name is forbidden to all except the High Priest, who should only speak it in the Holy of Holies of the Temple in Jerusalem on Yom Kippur. He then pronounces the name "just as it is written." As each blessing was made, the people in the courtyard were to prostrate themselves completely as they heard it spoken aloud. As the Temple has not been rebuilt since its destruction in 70, most modern Jews never pronounce YHWH but instead read Adonai ("My Lord") during prayer and while reading the Torah and as HaShem ("The Name") at other times. Similarly, the Vulgate used  ("The Lord") and most English translations of the Bible write "the " for YHWH and "the  God", "the Lord " or "the Sovereign " for Adonai YHWH instead of transcribing the name. The Septuagint may have originally used the Hebrew letters themselves amid its Greek text, but there is no scholarly consensus on this point. All surviving Christian-era manuscripts use  ("Lord") or very occasionally  ("God") to translate the many thousand occurrences of the Name. However, given the great preponderance of the anarthrous  solution for translating YHWH in the Septuagint and some disambiguation efforts by Christian-era copyists involving Kyrios (see especially scribal activity in Acts),  should probably not be considered historically as a serious early contender substitute for the divine Name.

Adonai 

As with Elohim, Adonai's grammatical form is usually explained as a plural of majesty. In the Hebrew Bible, it is nearly always used to refer to God (approximately 450 occurrences). As pronunciation of the Tetragrammaton came to be avoided in the Hellenistic period, Jews may have begun to drop the Tetragrammaton when presented alongside Adonai and subsequently expand it to cover for the Tetragrammaton in the forms of spoken prayer and written scripture.

The Phoenicians used it as a title of Tammuz, the origin of the Greek Adonis. It is also used very occasionally in Hebrew texts to refer to God (e.g. Psalm 136:3.) Deuteronomy 10:17 has the proper name  alongside the superlative constructions "God of gods" (literally, "the gods of gods") and "Lord of lords" ("the lords of lords": ; KJV: "For the  your God is God of gods, and Lord of lords").

Professor Yoel Elitzur explains this as a normal transformation when a Hebrew word becomes a name, giving as other examples Nathan, Yitzchak, and Yigal. As Adonai became the most common reverent substitute for the Tetragrammaton, it too became considered un-erasable due to its holiness. As such, most prayer books avoid spelling out the word Adonai, and instead write two  in its place.

El

El appears in Ugaritic, Phoenician and other 2nd and 1st millennium BCE texts both as generic "god" and as the head of the divine pantheon. In the Hebrew Bible, El appears very occasionally alone (e.g. Genesis 33:20, "Mighty God of Israel", and Genesis 46:3, "El the God of thy father"), but usually with some epithet or attribute attached (e.g. , "Most High El", "El of ",  "Everlasting El", "Living El",  "El my Shepherd", and  "El of Strength"), in which cases it can be understood as the generic "god". In theophoric names such as Gabriel ("Strength of God"), Michael ("Who is like God?"), Raphael ("God's medicine"), Ariel ("God's lion"), Daniel ("God's Judgment"), Israel ("one who has struggled with God"), Immanuel ("God is with us"), and Ishmael ("God hears"/"God listens") it is usually interpreted and translated as "God", but it is not clear whether these "el"s refer to the deity in general or to the god El in particular.

Elohim

When Elohim refers to God in the Hebrew Bible, singular verbs are used. The word is identical to elohim meaning gods or magistrates, and is cognate to the  found in Ugaritic, where it is used for the pantheon of Canaanite gods, the children of El and conventionally vocalized as "Elohim" although the original Ugaritic vowels are unknown. When the Hebrew Bible uses  not in reference to God, it is plural (for example, Exodus 20:2). There are a few other such uses in Hebrew, for example Behemoth. In Modern Hebrew, the singular word  ("owner") looks plural, but likewise takes a singular verb.

A number of scholars have traced the etymology to the Semitic root *yl, "to be first, powerful", despite some difficulties with this view. Elohim is thus the plural construct "powers". Hebrew grammar allows for this form to mean "He is the Power (singular) over powers (plural)", just as the word  means "owner" (see above). "He is lord (singular) even over any of those things that he owns that are lordly (plural)."

Theologians who dispute this claim cite the hypothesis that plurals of majesty came about in more modern times. Richard Toporoski, a classics scholar, asserts that plurals of majesty first appeared in the reign of Diocletian (CE 284–305). Indeed, Gesenius states in his book Hebrew Grammar the following:

The Jewish grammarians call such plurals ... plur. virium or virtutum; later grammarians call them plur. excellentiae, magnitudinis, or plur. maiestaticus.

This last name may have been suggested by the we used by kings when speaking of themselves (compare 1 Maccabees 10:19 and 11:31); and the plural used by God in Genesis 1:26 and 11:7; Isaiah 6:8 has been incorrectly explained in this way. It is, however, either communicative (including the attendant angels: so at all events in Isaiah 6:8 and Genesis 3:22), or according to others, an indication of the fullness of power and might implied. It is best explained as a plural of self-deliberation. The use of the plural as a form of respectful address is quite foreign to Hebrew.

Mark S. Smith has cited the use of plural as possible evidence to suggest an evolution in the formation of early Jewish conceptions of monotheism, wherein references to "the gods" (plural) in earlier accounts of verbal tradition became either interpreted as multiple aspects of a single monotheistic God at the time of writing, or subsumed under a form of monolatry, wherein the god(s) of a certain city would be accepted after the fact as a reference to the God of Israel and the plural deliberately dropped.

If understood this way,  means "divinity" or "deity". The word  is similarly syntactically singular when used as a name but syntactically plural otherwise. In many of the passages in which  occurs in the Bible, it refers to non-Israelite deities, or in some instances to powerful men or judges, and even angels (Exodus 21:6, Psalms 8:5) as a simple plural in those instances.

Shaddai

El Shaddai is one of the names of God in Judaism, with its etymology coming from the influence of the Ugaritic religion on modern Judaism. El Shaddai is conventionally translated as "God Almighty". While the translation of El as "god" in Ugaritic/Canaanite languages is straightforward, the literal meaning of Shaddai is the subject of debate.

Tzevaot
Tzevaot, Tsebaoth or Sabaoth ( "Armies"), usually translated "Hosts", appears in reference to armies or armed hosts of men but is not used as a divine epithet in the Torah, Joshua, or Judges. Starting in the Books of Samuel, the term "Lord of Hosts" appears hundreds of times throughout the Prophetic books, in Psalms, and in Chronicles.

The Hebrew word  was also absorbed in Ancient Greek and Latin (with no declension). Tertullian and other patristics used it with the meaning of "Army of angels of God".

Ehyeh 

 is the first of three responses given to Moses when he asks for God's name in the Book of Exodus. The King James Version of the Bible translates the Hebrew as "I Am that I Am" and uses it as a proper name for God.
Biblical Hebrew does not distinguish between grammatical tenses. It has instead an aspectual system in which the imperfect denotes any actions that are not yet completed, Accordingly,  can be rendered in English not only as "I am that I am" but also as "I will be what I will be" or "I will be who I will be", or "I shall prove to be whatsoever I shall prove to be" or even "I will be because I will be".

The word  is a relative pronoun whose meaning depends on the immediate context, so that "that", "who", "which", or "where" are all possible translations of that word.

Other names and titles

Baal

Baal, properly Baʿal, meant "owner" and, by extension, "lord", "master", and "husband" in Hebrew and the other Northwest Semitic languages. In some early contexts and theophoric names, it and Baali ("My Lord") were treated as synonyms of Adon and Adonai. After the time of Solomon and particularly after Jezebel's attempt to promote the worship of the Lord of Tyre Melqart, however, the name became particularly associated with the Canaanite storm god Baʿal Haddu and was gradually avoided as a title for Yahweh. The prophet Hosea in particular reproached the Israelites for continuing to use the term:

Elah
Elah (pl. The origin of the word is from Proto-Semitic ʔil and is thus cognate to the Hebrew, Arabic, Akkadian, and other Semitic languages' words for god. Elah is found in the Tanakh in the books of Ezra, Jeremiah (Jeremiah 10:11, the only verse in the entire book written in Aramaic), and Daniel. Elah is used to describe both pagan gods and the Abrahamic God.

 Elah Yisrael, God of Israel (Ezra 5:1)
 Elah Yerushelem, God of Jerusalem (Ezra 7:19)
 Elah Shemaya, God of Heaven (Ezra 7:23)
 Elah-avahati, God of my fathers, (Daniel 2:23)
 Elah Elahin, God of gods (Daniel 2:47)

El Roi

In the Book of Genesis, Hagar uses this name for the God who spoke to her through his angel. In Hebrew, her phrase "El Roi", literally, "God of Seeing Me", is translated in the King James Version as "Thou God seest me."

Elyon

The name Elyon occurs in combination with El, YHWH, Elohim and alone. It appears chiefly in poetic and later Biblical passages. The modern Hebrew adjective  means "supreme" (as in "Supreme Court") or "Most High".  has been traditionally translated into English as 'God Most High'.

Eternal One
"The Eternal One" or "The Eternal" is increasingly used, particularly in Reform and Reconstructionist communities seeking to use gender-neutral language. In the Torah,  ("the Everlasting God") is used at Genesis 21:33 to refer to God.

HaShem

It is common Jewish practice to restrict the use of the names of God to a liturgical context. In casual conversation some Jews, even when not speaking Hebrew, will call God HaShem, which is Hebrew for "the Name" (cf. Leviticus 24:11 and Deuteronomy 28:58). Likewise, when quoting from the Tanakh or prayers, some pious Jews will replace 'Adonai' with 'HaShem'. For example, when making audio recordings of prayer services, 'HaShem' will generally be substituted for 'Adonai'.

Samaritans use the Aramaic equivalent Shema (שמא, "the name") in much the same situations as Jews use HaShem.

Shalom

Talmudic authors, ruling on the basis of Gideon's name for an altar ("YHVH-Shalom", according to Judges 6:24), write that "the name of God is 'Peace'" (Shabbat 10b); consequently, a Talmudic opinion (10b) asserts that one would greet another with the word  in order for the word not to be forgotten in the exile. But one is not permitted to greet another with the word  in unholy places such as a bathroom, because of the holiness of the name.

Shekhinah

 is the presence or manifestation of God which has descended to "dwell" among humanity. The term never appears in the Hebrew Bible; later rabbis used the word when speaking of God dwelling either in the Tabernacle or amongst the people of Israel. The root of the word means "dwelling". Of the principal names of God, it is the only one that is of the feminine gender in Hebrew grammar. Some believe that this was the name of a female counterpart of God, but this is unlikely as the name is always mentioned in conjunction with an article (e.g.: "the Shekhina descended and dwelt among them" or "He removed Himself and His Shekhina from their midst"). This kind of usage does not occur in Semitic languages in conjunction with proper names. The term, however, may not be a name, as it may merely describe the presence of God, and not God Himself.

Uncommon or esoteric names
 Abir – "Strong One"
 Adir – "Great One"
 Adon Olam – "Master of the World"
 Aibishter – "The One Above" (Yiddish)
 Aleim – sometimes seen as an alternative transliteration of Elohim, A'lim "" in Arabic means "who intensively knows", A'alim "" means "who knows", the verb is A'lima  means "knew", while Allahumma "" in Arabic equals to "O'God" and used to supplicate him for something.
 Aravat (or Avarat) – "Father of Creation"; mentioned once in 2 Enoch, "On the tenth heaven is God, in the Hebrew tongue he is called Aravat".
  – "Our Father, Our King"
  – "The Creator"
 Dibbura or Dibbera – "The Word (The Law)" – used primarily in the Palestinian Targums of the Pentateuch (Aramaic); e.g. Num 7:89, The Word spoke to Moses from between the cherubim in the holy of holies.
 Ehiyeh sh'Ehiyeh – "I Am That I Am": a modern Hebrew version of "Ehyeh asher Ehyeh
 Ani Sh'ani - "I am that I am": another modern Hebrew form of "Ehyeh asher Ehyeh
 Ein Sof – "Endless, Infinite", Kabbalistic name of God
 El ha-Gibbor – "God the Hero" or "God the Strong" or "God the Warrior". Allah jabbar "" in Arabic means "the God is formidable and invincible"
 Emet – "Truth" (the "Seal of God." [Cf.] The word is composed of the first, middle, and last letters of the Hebrew alphabet. See also Alpha and Omega#Judaism)
 HaKadosh, Barukh Hu (Hebrew); Kudsha, Brikh Hu (Aramaic);  (Arabic) – "The Holy One, Blessed Be He"
 HaRachaman – "The Merciful One"; Rahman – " (Arabic)
 Kadosh Israel – "Holy One of Israel"
 Magen Avraham – "Shield of Abraham"
 Makom or HaMakom – literally "The Place", perhaps meaning "The Omnipresent" (see Tzimtzum)
 Malbish Arumim – "Clother of the Naked"
 Matir Asurim – "Freer of the Captives"
 Mechayeh HaKol In Arabic al-Muhyi al-Kull  – "Life giver to All" (Reform version of Mechayeh Metim)
 Mechayeh Metim – "Life giver to the Dead"
 Melech HaMelachim – "The King of Kings" or Melech Malchei HaMelachim "The King, King of Kings", to express superiority to the earthly ruler's title.
 Melech HaOlam – "The King of the World"
 Memra d'Adonai – "The Word of the LORD" (plus variations such as "My Word") – restricted to the Aramaic Targums (the written Tetragrammaton is represented in various ways such as YYY, YWY, YY, but pronounced as the Hebrew "Adonai")
 Mi She'amar V'haya Ha`olam – "He who spoke, and the world came into being."
 Netzakh Yisrael – "The Glory of Israel" (1 Samuel 15:29)
 Oseh Shalom – "Maker of Peace"
 Pokeach Ivrim – "Opener of Blind Eyes"
 Ribono shel'Olam – "Master of the World".
 Rachmana – "The Merciful One" (Aramaic)
 Ro'eh Yisra'el – "Shepherd of Israel"
 Rofeh Cholim – "Healer of the Sick"
 Shomer Yisrael – "Guardian of Israel"
 Somech Noflim – "Supporter of the Fallen"
 Tzur Israel – "Rock of Israel"
 YHWH-Niss'i (Adonai-Nissi) – "The  Our Banner"
 YHWH-Rapha – "The  that Healeth"
 YHWH-Ro'i – "The  My Shepherd"
 YHWH-Shalom – "The  Our Peace"
 YHWH-Shammah (Adonai-shammah) – "The  Is Present"
  YHWH-Tsidkenu – "The  Our Righteousness"
 YHWH-Yireh (Adonai-jireh) – "The  Will Provide"
 Yotsehr 'Or – "Fashioner of Light"
 Zokef kefufim – "Straightener of the Bent"

Writing divine names

In Jewish tradition the sacredness of the divine name or titles must be recognized by the professional sofer (scribe) who writes Torah scrolls, or tefillin and mezuzah. Before transcribing any of the divine titles or name, they prepare mentally to sanctify them. Once they begin a name, they do not stop until it is finished, and they must not be interrupted while writing it, even to greet a king. If an error is made in writing it may not be erased, but a line must be drawn round it to show that it is canceled, and the whole page must be put in a genizah (burial place for scripture) and a new page begun.

Kabbalistic use
One of the most important names is that of the Ein Sof ( "Endless"), which first came into use after 1300 CE. 
Another name is derived from the names . By spelling these four names out with the names of the Hebrew letters ( and ) this new forty-five letter long name is produced.

The seventy-two-fold name is derived from three verses in Exodus 14:19–21. Each of the verses contains 72 letters. When the verses are read boustrophedonically 72 names, three letter each, are produced (the niqqud of the source verses is disregarded in respect to pronunciation). Some regard this name as the Shemhamphorasch. The Proto-Kabbalistic book Sefer Yetzirah describe how the creation of the world was achieved by manipulation of these 216 sacred letters that form the names of God.

Erasing the name of God

From this it is understood by the rabbis that one should not erase or blot out the name of God. The general halachic opinion is that this only applies to the sacred Hebrew names of God, not to other euphemistic references; there is a dispute as to whether the word "God" in English or other languages may be erased or whether Jewish law and/or Jewish custom forbids doing so, directly or as a precautionary "fence" about the law.

The words "God" and "Lord" are written by some Jews as "G-d" and "L-rd" as a way of avoiding writing any name of God in full out. The hyphenated version of the English name ("G-d") can be destroyed, so by writing that form, religious Jews prevent documents in their possession with the unhyphenated form from being destroyed later. Alternatively, a euphemistic reference such as Hashem (literally, "the Name") may be substituted, or an abbreviation thereof, such as in BH (בְּעֶזרַת הַשֵׁם B'ezrat Hashem'' "with the help of the Name").

See also

 Ancient of Days
 Baal Shem
 Besiyata Dishmaya
 Names of God
 Names of God in Christianity
 Names of God in Islam
 Naming taboo (a similar prohibition in China)
 Sacred Name Bibles
 Ten Commandments
 Vishnu Sahasranama

Explanatory notes

References

Citations

Bibliography
 .
 .
 .
 .
 .
 .
 .

External links
 God's names in Jewish thought and in the light of Kabbalah
 The Name of God as Revealed in Exodus 3:14—an explanation of its meaning.
 Bibliography on Divine Names in the Dead Sea Scrolls
 Jewish Encyclopedia: Names of God
 "Ehyeh Asher Ehyeh" - Song and Video of Ancient Yemenite Prayer From the Diwan
 

 
Deities in the Hebrew Bible
Hebrew Bible words and phrases
Language and mysticism